Platon (born Platon Antoniou, born 20 April 1968) is a British portrait and documentary photographer.

Biography 
Platon was born on 20 April 1968 in Greece. His father (Jim Antoniou) was a Greek architect and illustrator and his mother is an art historian. Platon is currently married and has two children. He was raised in Greece and moved to England at the age of 8. Platon studied graphic design at Saint Martin's School of Art where he encountered his first experience with photography. He went on to receive his masters in fine arts from the Royal College of Art where he met his instructor and mentor, John Hind of Vogue.

Career 
After leaving college in 1992, Platon began in fashion photography and portraiture. Platon left London for New York to begin his commercial career with John Kennedy Jr. at George magazine. Some of Platon's commercial work includes photographing for Levi's, IBM, Nike, and Motorola, along with companies such as Timex, Tanqueray, Kenneth Cole, and Rayban. His photographs have also been featured on the cover of well-known magazines including Time, Esquire, and George. In 2008 Platon became a staff photographer for The New Yorker. He would handle large scale portfolios such as his first assignment, a portfolio of the Little Rock Nine celebrating the civil rights movement.

Aesthetic 
Platon's father helped him develop an understanding of form and texture through the principles of Modernism reflected in his bold no distraction style. His graphic design education influences how he takes his photographs by shooting with the final graphic treatment in mind. Platon aims to capture the truth, to find it in the subject and bring it out. He works with limited sessions for photo shoots, which make the photographs more intense and authentic.

The People's Portfolio 
Platon founded The People's Portfolio, a non-profit organization. Platon photographs those who are fighting for civil and human rights, giving a voice to those who are unheard. His portfolios include photographs of Burmese victims and exiles, Egyptian revolutionaries, and those fighting against oppression in Russia. Platon has also photographed and interviewed women from the Congo who have experienced sexual violence. He has collaborated with the Human Rights Watch, The New Yorker, the National Center for Civil and Human Rights, ExxonMobil and the UN Foundation. Through the People's Portfolio, Platon aims to raise awareness of those facing oppression.

Notable works 
Platon has photographed many well known leaders. Bill Clinton was the first president that he worked with and photographed.  Other photographs of well known leaders include Donald Trump, Muammar al Qaddafi, Barack Obama, George W. Bush, and Muhammad Ali.

His photograph of Vladimir Putin was on the cover of Time in 2007.

Platon's first solo exhibition was held at the Leica Gallery in New York and showcased documentary photographs from Colombia and India.

He currently has three published books. His book Platon's Republic was published in 2004 featuring his photographs of prominent figures commissioned by magazines. Service Platon is a collection of photographs that highlight the physical and psychological wounds and courage of soldiers and their families. Power Platon, published in 2011 is a historical record of prominent political figures of the twenty-first century.

Platon was profiled in the first season of the Netflix docu-series Abstract: The Art of Design.

External Sites
Platon Photo

Sources

Photographers from New York City
Greek photographers
1968 births
Living people
21st-century photographers
Alumni of Saint Martin's School of Art
Alumni of the Royal College of Art
Greek emigrants to the United Kingdom